Bosworth is a constituency represented in the House of Commons of the UK Parliament since 2019 by Luke Evans, a Conservative.

Boundaries

1885–1918: The Sessional Divisions of Ashby-de-la-Zouch (except the parishes of Bardon, Breedon, Thringstone, Osgathorpe, and Whitwick) and Market Bosworth.

1918–1950: The Urban Districts of Coalville and Hinckley, the Rural Districts of Hinckley and Market Bosworth, and the parish of Bardon in the Rural District of Ashby-de-la-Zouch.

1950–1955: The Urban Districts of Coalville and Hinckley, and the Rural District of Market Bosworth.

1955–1974: The Urban District of Coalville as constituted by the County of Leicester (Coalville Urban District) Confirmation Order 1953, the Urban District of Hinckley, and the Rural District of Market Bosworth.

1974–1983: The Urban Districts of Coalville and Hinckley as altered by the West Midland Counties Order 1965 and the County of Leicester (Coalville Urban District) Confirmation Order 1969, and the Rural District of Market Bosworth.

1983–1997: The Borough of Hinckley and Bosworth, and the Borough of Charnwood ward of Bradgate.

1997–2010: The Borough of Hinckley and Bosworth wards of Ambien, Bagworth, Barleston, Nailstone and Osbaston, Barwell, Burbage, Cadeby, Carlton and Market Bosworth, Castle, Clarendon, De Montfort, Desford and Peckleton, Earl Shilton, Markfield, Newbold Verdon, Sheepy and Witherley, Trinity, and Twycross and Shackerstone.

2010–present: The Borough of Hinckley and Bosworth wards of Ambien, Barlestone, Nailstone and Osbaston, Barwell, Burbage St Catherines and Lash Hill, Burbage Sketchley and Stretton, Cadeby, Carlton and Market Bosworth with Shackerstone, Earl Shilton, Hinckley Castle, Hinckley Clarendon, Hinckley De Montfort, Hinckley Trinity, Markfield, Stanton and Fieldhead, Newbold Verdon with Desford and Peckleton, Ratby, Bagworth and Thornton, and Twycross and Witherley with Sheepy.

History
The Western, or Bosworth, division was created in 1885, and included part of the Ashby de la Zouch and all of the Market Bosworth petty sessional divisions.  It was redefined in 1918 to cover the urban districts of Coalville and Hinckley, the rural districts of Hinckley and Market Bosworth and the civil parish of Bardon from Ashby RD.  Hinckley RD was abolished in the 1930s and in 1948 and 1970 the Bosworth constituency by which date it was shaped to eventually all of Coalville, Hinckley and Market Bosworth RD. Coalville has been part of North West Leicestershire since the 1983 election.

The seat was held by Labour for 25 years until the Conservatives gained it in the 1970 general election and they have represented it since then. Hinckley expanded greatly after World War II and is the most economically significant town other than Leicester in Leicestershire however unlike the borough the constituency retains under the independent Boundary Commission the poetic name of Bosworth, alluding to the Battle of Bosworth of the medieval Wars of the Roses which is recreated annually on the battlefield.

The seat had a coal mining tradition; however, other industry, such as defence, trade and retail supports the residential town of Hinckley and its rural hinterland. The area of strongest Labour support is the former mining village of Earl Shilton, which is now in local elections generally over-shadowed by surrounding areas with majority-Conservative support. The constituency was once held for Labour by Woodrow Wyatt, who later left the party and became one of its most voluble critics in the 1980s.

During the 2015 count, a police car outside the Hinckley Leisure Centre, where the count was taking place, caught fire then exploded while being hosed down by firefighters. Five men were arrested.

Members of Parliament

Elections

Elections in the 2010s

Going into the 2015 general election, this was the 180th most marginal constituency in Great Britain, the Liberal Democrats requiring a swing from the Conservatives of 4.6% to take the seat (based on the result of the 2010 general election).

Elections in the 2000s

Elections in the 1990s

Elections in the 1980s

Elections in the 1970s

Elections in the 1960s

Elections in the 1950s

Elections in the 1940s

Elections in the 1930s

Election in the 1920s

% change and swing from 1924

Election in the 1910s

Election results 1885–1918

Elections in the 1880s

Elections in the 1890s

Elections in the 1900s

Elections in the 1910s

General Election 1914–15:

Another General Election was required to take place before the end of 1915. The political parties had been making preparations for an election to take place and by July 1914, the following candidates had been selected; 
Liberal: Henry McLaren
Unionist:

See also
List of parliamentary constituencies in Leicestershire and Rutland

Notes

References

External links 
nomis Constituency Profile for Bosworth – presenting data from the ONS annual population survey and other official statistics.

Parliamentary constituencies in Leicestershire
Constituencies of the Parliament of the United Kingdom established in 1885